Frank Sullivan Jr. (born March 21, 1950) was the 102nd justice of the Indiana Supreme Court. He served from November 1, 1993, to July 31, 2012.  he is Professor of Practice at the Indiana University Robert H. McKinney School of Law.

Sullivan attended Dartmouth College, before receiving his legal education from Indiana University Maurer School of Law. He later achieved an LL.M. from the University of Virginia School of Law.

References

Justices of the Indiana Supreme Court
1950 births
Living people
Dartmouth College alumni
Indiana University Maurer School of Law alumni
University of Virginia School of Law alumni